Ilona Stetina (1855-1932), was a Romanian pioneer educator and women's rights activist. She was co-founder of the Maria Dorothea Association for women teachers (1885) and its vice president in 1889-1932, editor of the national women's education in 1890-1915, director of the State Women's Trade School in 1911-1926, and a leading figure in the national movement to improve women's teaching and vocational training in Romania.

References
 Francisca de Haan, Krasimira Daskalova & Anna Loutfi: Biographical Dictionary of Women's Movements and Feminisms in Central, Easterna and South Eastern Europe, 19th and 20th centuries Central European University Press, 2006

1855 births
1932 deaths
Romanian women's rights activists
Romanian feminists
19th-century Romanian people
19th-century Romanian women
20th-century Romanian women
19th-century Romanian educators
20th-century Romanian educators